"How Do I Survive?" is a song by Japanese rock band Superfly, the first released following the release of their debut self-titled album. It was used as the jingle for Mode Gakuen commercials in 2008, and it was later released as the band's sixth single and the first off of second album Box Emotions. "How Do I Survive?" became the group's first top ten song on the Oricon charts; it also was the highest the band had then ever charted on the Japan Hot 100, reaching number 3.

Track listing

References

External links
"How Do I Survive?" on Superfly's official website

2008 singles
2008 songs
Japanese-language songs
Songs used as jingles
Superfly (band) songs
Warner Music Japan singles